Dawn Valadez (born March 18, 1965) is a Mexican-American documentary filmmaker and fundraiser based in the San Francisco Bay Area in California. She directed and produced the documentary film, Going On 13 (2008) and is currently working on her next film, Teacher Like Me and co-directing The Pushouts.

Education 
Valadez attended University of California, Santa Cruz (UCSC) where she received a women's studies and psychology degree (1988).  She also attended University of California, Berkeley where she received a master's degree in social welfare.

Career 
Valadez's focus is social work, fundraising for non-profit organizations, and advocating for minority groups such as people of color, low-income people, and youth. She previously worked at the REACH Ashland Youth Center, and was a board member of the San Leandro Political Action Committee for Excellence, and the San Leandro Education Foundation. Currently she is currently a development consultant. She is a board member of the Bay Area Video Coalition (BAVC).

Filmography 
 GOING ON 13  - Valadez directed and produced her first feature-length film Going on 13 (2008) with Kristy Guevara-Flanagan. It was funded by CalHumanities, Public Broadcasting, and ITVS. The film premiered on September 1, 2009. It was the winner of Best Documentary at LA Femme Film Festival 2008, Best Documentary at Broad Humor Film Festival 2009, and the Cine Golden Eagle Award 2008.  The documentary explores the lives of four young girls of color in the Bay Area, Ariana, Isha, Rosie, and Esme and follows their stories from the ages of 9 to 13. The film captures the girls' transition from being a child to becoming a young woman, their struggles with family matters, self identity, and everyday life.
 TEACHER LIKE ME is an upcoming  2018 documentary directed by Valadez and produced by Katherine Saviskas. It tells the stories of 5 adults, David, Deprece, Jari, Joe, and Sergio. All of them are educators of color who were once failed as students by the education system. Some were gang members and some were in prison, but became educators in hopes of creating a new education pipeline.
 THE PUSHOUTS - Valadez is co-directing The Pushouts, a documentary about Victor Rios who at one point was a teenager involved in gangs, but is now a well appreciated University professor. The film explores breaking the school to prison pipeline.

References 

1965 births
Living people
American documentary filmmakers
University of California, Santa Cruz alumni
UC Berkeley School of Social Welfare alumni
American people of Mexican descent
American women documentary filmmakers
Filmmakers from California